Arnotts is the oldest and largest department store in the Ireland. Its flagship store is located on Henry Street, on the north side of central Dublin. It has been a member of the International Association of Department Stores from 2007 to 2012.

History
The store has its origins in a business founded in 1843 at 14 Henry Street, by George Cannock and Andrew White. In 1845, two bankers, Andrew and Patrick Reid, became partners in the business. In 1848, White died, and the Scottish entrepreneur John Arnott took shares in the company. In 1865, Cannock departed the business, and the business was renamed as Arnott's.

The main shop occupies much of the block behind the GPO to the west of O'Connell Street, between Henry Street and Abbey Street, covering an area of some 300,000 square feet. The main entrance is on the pedestrianised Henry Street. Across O'Connell Street in North Earl Street was Arnotts sister store, Boyers & Co, which closed down on 31 January 2016.

A footwear-only branch of Arnotts was located in the Stillorgan Shopping Centre until 2011, with a former branch on Grafton Street initially changed to be branded as a River Island, before being sold in 2003.

Before the 2010 takeover, Arnotts was privately owned by a consortium, Nesbitt Acquisitions, comprising about 50 members of the Nesbitt family, led by Richard Nesbitt. The original owners retain one per cent of the business. In July 2010, Arnotts was taken over by Anglo Irish Bank and Ulster Bank, due to large outstanding loans on its failed "Northern Quarter" property development. On , the store was taken over by Selfridges, a chain of department stores, and now trades as a sister store to Brown Thomas which is part of the same group.

The newsreader Aengus Mac Grianna used to work in the Sports Department.

Arnotts were one of the longest standing sponsors of GAA until 2009, when their 18-year partnership as sponsors of Dublin GAA came to an end.

On 24 December 2021 it was announced that the Selfridges company had been sold to a joint venture between Thai Central and Signa Holding in Austria for $5.37 billion, a deal which included Arnotts as well as the Brown Thomas chain and De Bijenkorf in the Netherlands.

Northern Quarter

In 2006, Nesbitt Acquisitions announced their plans to redevelop their properties located between O'Connell Street and Liffey Street, incorporating Independent House, the former Independent Newspapers building on Abbey Street. The new development was to be called the Northern Quarter and was to be one of the largest rejuvenation projects to ever be undertaken in this area of the city centre. The estimated cost of the project was €750,000,000. Following planning difficulties and the financial crisis in Ireland, the project never went ahead. Arnotts incurred large debts in acquiring property, leading to their takeover by financial institutions in 2010.

As part of this project, it was intended to move the department store to a nearby former Debenhams Ireland branch in the Jervis Shopping Centre, but as plans changed this opened as "Arnotts Project"; which operated for less than a year before being surrendered back to the landlord.

References

External links
 Official website

1843 establishments in Ireland
Clothing retailers of Ireland
Companies based in Dublin (city)
Department stores of Ireland
Retail companies established in 1843
Selfridges
Shops in Dublin (city)
Abbey Street